Mordechai "Moti" Giladi (born December 18, 1946, Haifa) is an Israeli singer and actor.

He released his first album in 1969 after he finished his military service. He lived in the United States of America in the seventies and was a cantor in a Jewish community.

He returned to Israel in the early eighties and, in 1986, joined Kdam Eurovision with Sarai Tzuriel. At the end of the contest, they won and were chosen to represent Israel in the 1986 Eurovision Song Contest held in Norway Bergen to represent Israel and the duet finished in nineteenth place with 7 points.

Since the early nineties, Giladi has continued his career as an actor and also participated at Big Brother's second VIP season, eliminated only one week before the finale.

References 

20th-century Israeli male singers
Eurovision Song Contest entrants for Israel
Eurovision Song Contest entrants of 1986
Living people
Big Brother (franchise) contestants
1946 births